Lenin M. Sivam is a Canadian filmmaker. Born in Jaffna, Sri Lanka, he moved to Toronto, Ontario, Canada in 1991.  

His first short, A Few Good People, won the Best Short Film of the Year Award from the Independent Art Film Society in 2006.  

After several years of making short films, Sivam first achieved international recognition with his feature film debut 1999 in 2009, which won awards at film festivals internationally.  

Sivam's success continued with his next film, A GUN & A RING (2013), which was well received both critically and commercially and made its world premiere at the Shanghai International Film Festival in June 2013 and shortlisted for the coveted Golden Goblet Award. 

Sivam's film Roobha (2018) was well-received in many top international film festivals, including Goa, Cambridge and Montreal.

The Protector (2022), a thriller, screened at many festivals internationally, opening the Blood in the Snow Festival in Toronto and closing the Jaffna International Cinema Festival. It garnered the Best Feature Film Award at the Canal de Panama International Film Festival. 

The Protector stars Chelsea Clark (Ginny and Georgia) and features Rebecca Jenkins (Supernatural) and Andrew Gillies (The Virgin Suicides), Munro Chambers (Turbo Kid), and Jasmin Geljo (Schitt's Creek). It also introduces Pras Lingam to an in-front of the camera role. 

CBR.com writes Lingam is "easily the film's most intoxicating aspect" and "Lingam and Clark both really shine in their roles." 

The Protector will be released to streaming platforms (Amazon Prime, among others) on February 13, 2023.

Filmography 
The Protector (2022)
Roobha (2018)
A Gun & a Ring (2013)
1999 (2009)
The Next Door (2008) – short thriller
Strength (Uruthy) (2007)
A Few Good People (Iniyavarkal) (2006)

References

External links 
Lenin M. Sivam’s first Tamil full-feature film 1999 has been selected for VIFF (canadianimmigrant.ca)

1974 births
Canadian people of Sri Lankan Tamil descent
Canadian male screenwriters
Film directors from Toronto
Living people
Sri Lankan Tamil diaspora
Sri Lankan Hindus
Sri Lankan Tamil film directors
Tamil film directors
Tamil screenwriters
University of Waterloo alumni
Writers from Toronto
Asian-Canadian filmmakers